Filipp Danilovich Gorelenko (Cherkasy Raion, 25 November 1888  – Leningrad, 25 January 1956) was a Soviet Army lieutenant general and a Hero of the Soviet Union.

Biography 
Gorelenko participated in the First World War and the Russian Civil War. 

From June 1937 until August 1939 he was commander of the 14th Rifle Division. From August 1939 to July 1940 he led the 50th Rifle Corps during the Winter War with Finland. In February 1940, parts of his Corps broke through the Mannerheim Line together with the 34th Rifle Corps. For skilful leadership of the corps and personal courage, on 21 March 1940 Gorelenko was awarded the title of Hero of the Soviet Union. He was the only corps commander to be awarded this title at the end of the war. 

From July 1940 he was deputy commander of the Leningrad Military District. On 28 January 1941, F. D. Gorelenko became commander of the 7th Army. At the start of the Continuation War in June 1941, he fought with his 7th Army against the Finnish and German Army in Karelia. On 24 September 1941, he was removed from his post and appointed deputy commander of the same army, but on 9 November 1941, he was re-instated as commander of the 7th Army.
On 16 May 1942, he became commander of the 32nd Army and held this position until the end of the war with Finland. He participated in the Svir–Petrozavodsk Offensive and Battle of Ilomantsi (1944).  

After the war, from December 1945, Gorelenko was deputy commander of the White Sea Military District. Since November 1949 he was Chairman of the DOSAAF in the Karelo Finnish SSR. He was also elected Deputy of the Supreme Council of the Karelo-Finnish SSR. 

In 1951 he retired.

Sources
 Generals.dk

1888 births
1956 deaths
Soviet lieutenant generals
Russian military personnel of World War I
Soviet military personnel of World War II
Russian people of World War II
Frunze Military Academy alumni
Heroes of the Soviet Union
Recipients of the Order of Lenin
Recipients of the Order of the Red Banner
Recipients of the Order of Kutuzov, 1st class
Burials at Bogoslovskoe Cemetery